The Hungarian Company of the Lithuanian Field Hetman ( or) was a military unit of the Grand Duchy of Lithuania. The unit was considered as the Lithuanian army's grenadiers.

History 
The company was formed in 1717. The grenadier company's chef was the Field Hetman of Lithuania and the unit was always present wherever he was. The company had 80 soldiers in 1786. It was disbanded in 1793.

Captains

Bibliography

Citations

References 

Grand Duchy of Lithuania
Military units and formations established in 1717